A bracket turn is a kind of one-foot turn in figure skating. 

The transition between edges during the turn is the same as for a three turn—for example, forward inside edge to back outside edge—but unlike a three turn, in which the cusp of the turn points into the curve of the arc on which it is skated, a bracket turn is counterrotated so that the cusp points outward. The tracing of the turn on the ice resembles a curly bracket "}".

Brackets are considered advanced turns in figure skating and commonly appear only in step sequences instead of as a simple means of changing direction. They were also part of the compulsory figures, which skaters were required to perform in every routine until they were abolished in 1990. 

Figure skating elements